Alan Virginius (born 3 January 2003) is a French professional footballer who plays as a forward for Ligue 1 club Lille.

Career

Sochaux
On 6 July 2020, Virginius signed his first professional contract with Sochaux. Virginius made his professional debut with Sochaux in a 2–2 Ligue 2 tie with Rodez on 19 September 2020.

Lille
On 17 August 2022, Virginius signed with Ligue 1 side Lille.

References

External links
 
 
 

2003 births
Living people
People from Soisy-sous-Montmorency
Black French sportspeople
French footballers 
Footballers from Val-d'Oise
Association football forwards
France youth international footballers 
Ligue 1 players
Ligue 2 players
Championnat National 2 players
FC Sochaux-Montbéliard players
Entente SSG players
Lille OSC players